Wesley Mitchell Obermueller (born December 22, 1976) is a former Major League Baseball pitcher.

He began his career in the Kansas City Royals organization when he was selected in the 2nd round of the 1999 Major League Baseball Draft. He was released by the Braves on April 17, and then played for the Orix Buffaloes in Japan. Before the  season, he signed with the Florida Marlins. Before the  season, he signed with the Samsung Lions in the KBO League and was released in July.

Obermueller studied at the University of Iowa.

External links

Career statistics and player information from Korea Baseball Organization

1976 births
Living people
Major League Baseball pitchers
Baseball players from Iowa
Kansas City Royals players
Milwaukee Brewers players
Florida Marlins players
American expatriate baseball players in Japan
Orix Buffaloes players
Iowa Hawkeyes baseball players
Wichita Wranglers players
Indianapolis Indians players
Omaha Royals players
Nashville Sounds players
Richmond Braves players
Albuquerque Isotopes players
KBO League pitchers
American expatriate baseball players in South Korea
Samsung Lions players
Waterloo Bucks players